Dolendougou is a commune in the Cercle of Dioïla in the Koulikoro Region of south-western Mali. The main village (chef-lieu) is Dandougou.

References

External links
. This document gives 314 km2 as the area of the commune.

Communes of Koulikoro Region